Samuel Dibble (September 16, 1837 – September 16, 1913) was a lawyer, educator and U.S. Representative from South Carolina.

Birth and childhood

Samuel Dibble was born in Charleston, South Carolina, the oldest son of Philander Virgil (1808-1883) and Frances Ann (Evans) Dibble (1815-1891). Philander and his brother Andrew Dibble (1800-1846) moved from Bethel, Connecticut, to Charleston engaging in business together as hatters. Ann Evans was a descendant of the Gabeau family of French Huguenots and the Henley family of England. Dibble is a direct descendant of Thomas Dibble who came from England to Dorchester, Massachusetts, in 1630 as part of the Puritan migration to New England (1620–1640) and in 1635, Thomas Dibble was one of the founders of Windsor, Connecticut.

Young Dibble pursued an academic course in Bethel, Connecticut (his father's birthplace), and Charleston, South Carolina.

College and law school years

Starting in 1853, Dibble attended the College of Charleston for two years, and graduated A. B. from Wofford College, Spartanburg, South Carolina, in July, 1856, under the presidency of Rev. William M. Wightman, being the first graduate of that institution. While at Wofford, Dibble was a member of the Calhoun Literary Society. Dibble later received the degree LL. D. from his alma mater.

After graduating he taught at Shilow Academy and Pine Grove Academy in Orangeburg District from 1856–57 and was assistant teacher of the preparatory department of Wofford College in the spring of 1858. Dibble also studied law between 1858-59 under Jefferson Choice of Spartanburg, and Lesesne and Wilkins of Charleston, and was admitted as an attorney of law in December, 1859, and as a solicitor in equity in 1865 having studied equity under Hon. Charles H. Simonton. In January, 1860, he began his practice of law in Orangeburg, South Carolina.

He served in the Confederate States Army throughout the Civil War.
He resumed the practice of law in Orangeburg, South Carolina and also edited the Orangeburg News.

Military service

On January 3, 1861, Samuel Dibble volunteered as a private in the Edisto Rifles in Col. Johnson Hagood's First Regiment of South Carolina Volunteers later attaining the rank of first lieutenant. The company later became a part of the Eutaw Regiment, Twenty-Fifth South Carolina Volunteers under Col. Charles H. Simonton, a part of Hagood's Brigade, Hokes' Division of the Army of Northern Virginia. He was also a lieutenant of Wade Hampton III.

Politics

Samuel Dibble served as member of the State house of representatives in 1877 and 1878.
Trustee of the University of South Carolina at Columbia in 1878.
He served as member of the Board of School Commissioners of Orangeburg County.
He served as delegate to the Democratic National Convention in 1880.
Presented credentials as a Democratic Member-elect to the Forty-seventh Congress to fill a vacancy thought to exist by reason of the death (pending a contest) of Michael P. O'Connor, and served from June 9, 1881, to May 31, 1882, when the seat was awarded to Edmund W.M. Mackey under the original election.

Dibble was elected to the Forty-eighth and to the three succeeding Congresses (March 4, 1883 – March 3, 1891).
He served as chairman of the Committee on Public Buildings and Grounds (Forty-ninth and Fiftieth Congresses).
He declined to be a candidate for reelection in 1890.

Later life

He engaged in banking and other business interests in Orangeburg, South Carolina.
He died near Baltimore, Maryland, September 16, 1913, his 76th birthday.
He was interred in Sunny Side Cemetery, Orangeburg, South Carolina.

Sources

References

Samuel Dibble, Wofford College
VanBuren Lamb, Jr.,Your Ancestors
Descendants of the Founders of Ancient Windsor

External links 
 

1837 births
1913 deaths
College of Charleston alumni
Wofford College alumni
Confederate States Army officers
Democratic Party members of the United States House of Representatives from South Carolina
19th-century American politicians
People of South Carolina in the American Civil War
Members of the United States House of Representatives removed by contest